Hasankendi is a village in the Adıyaman District, Adıyaman Province, Turkey. Its population is 525 (2021).

The hamlet of Çaylı is attached to the village.

References

Villages in Adıyaman District

Kurdish settlements in Adıyaman Province